The list of symphonies in A-flat major includes:

 Edward Elgar
 Symphony No. 1, Op. 55 (1908)
 Jef van Hoof
 Symphony No. 2 (1941)
 Hans Rott
 Symphony for Strings (unfinished; 3 movements survive) (Nowak 37) (1874-5)
 William Grant Still
 Symphony No. 1 in A flat major, "Afro-American" (1930)
 Johann Baptist Wanhal
 Symphony in A-flat major, Bryan Ab1

See also
List of symphonies by key

References

A flat major
Symphonies